The following is a list of notable rap music artists from Nigeria.

A 
A-Q
Eedris Abdulkareem
Eva Alordiah

B 
 Andre Blaze
 Blaqbonez
 Base One

C 
CDQ
Chinko Ekun

D 
Da Emperor
Da Grin (deceased) 
D'banj
Dr SID
Durella
DJ AB
Dice Ailes

E 

ELDee
Emmy Gee
Erigga
Efe

F
Falz

I 
Ice Prince
Illbliss
IllRymz
Ikechukwu

J 
Jesse Jagz
Ian Jazzi

K 
Kheengz

L 
Ladipoe
Laycon
Lil Kesh
Lyrikal

M 
M.I Abaga
M-Trill
Mo'Cheddah
Mode 9

N 
Naeto C

O 
Olamide

P 
Pepenazi
Phyno

R 
Reminisce
Ruggedman
Rema

S 
Skales
Sasha P

V
Vector

W
Weird MC

Y
Ycee
Yung6ix

References 

 
Nigerian rappers
Rappers